Viktor Isaakovich Fainberg (26 November 1931 – 2 January 2023) was a Russian philologist, prominent figure of the dissident movement in the Soviet Union, participant of the 1968 Red Square demonstration, and the director of the Campaign Against Psychiatric Abuse.

Biography 
Viktor Fainberg was born to the married couple of Isaac Fainberg and Sarah Dashevskaya. While attending school during an antisemitic campaign of 1948-1952, he was subjected to harassment that, in his own words, he did not reconcile himself to, but entered the fray with an abuser. As the result of these frays, he got a referral to a psychiatrist.

In 1957, in connection with antisemitic insult, he had a fight with a policeman and for this reason was sentenced to 1 year of corrective labor.

In 1968, he graduated from the English unit of the philological department of Leningrad University where he defended his diploma thesis about writer Salinger with distinction. In the summer of 1968, Fainberg worked as a guide at Pavlovsk Palace.

Fainberg was one of the seven persons who participated in the 1968 Red Square demonstration against the Soviet-led military invasion of Czechoslovakia. During the demonstration and his arrest, he lost many teeth and in this unpresentable state was never presented for trial; instead, he was placed to a psychiatric hospital.

Fainberg was examined by  the Serbsky Institute commission composed of G.V. Morozov, D.R. Lunts and Y.L. Lindau. In their act No 35 / s dated 10 October 1968, they did not mention the invasion of Czechoslovakia, which gave rise to this demonstration, the action was merely described as 'disorderly conduct at Red Square,' and Fainberg's mental condition was described as follows:

As a result, he was committed for compulsory treatment to the Special Psychiatric Hospital in Leningrad where he was confined from January 1969 to February 1973.

At the hospital, Fainberg went on hunger strike in protest, was subjected to forced feeding and was treated with chlorpromazine despite his hyperthyroidism that was somatic contraindication to chlorpromazine therapy.

Marina Voikhanskaya, a psychiatrist at the hospital, assisted Fainberg by passing information about him to dissidents outside. She was demoted for this activity which helped Fainberg be released. In 1974, Fainberg emigrated from the Soviet Union to Israel, and Marina Voikhanskaya emigrated to the UK in 1975.

In emigration, Fainberg initiated the formation of "Campaign Against Psychiatric Abuses" (CAPA) to fight punitive psychiatry in the USSR. In 1983, the Soviet Union was expelled from the World Psychiatric Association (WPA).

Fainberg died on 2 January 2023, at the age of 91.

Other 
On 27 October 2014, along with other three dissenters from summer of 1968, Fainberg was decorated by Slovak President Andrej Kiska for his show of solidarity to Czechoslovakia. He received the Medal of the President of the Slovak republic along with Vladimir Dremlyuga and Pavel Litvinov. Natalya Gorbanevskaya received the highest Slovak award, Order of the White Double Cross, in memoriam.

British playwright Tom Stoppard wrote the play Every Good Boy Deserves Favour dedicated to Vladimir Bukovsky and Viktor Fainberg.

Fainberg has a daughter, Sarah, who is a research fellow at the Institute for National Security Studies in Tel Aviv.

References

Sources 
 Хроника текущих событий
 ВИКТОР ФАЙНБЕРГ: ДВА ГОДА, 30 ЛЕТ И ПОКУШЕНИЕ
 Горбаневская Н. «Герои или безумцы?»
 Пшизов В. Синдром замкнутого пространства (Записки судебного психиатра) 
 Интервью Файнберга Международному французскому радио

Video 
The Institute for the Study of Totalitarian Regimes videotaped Fainberg's spoken autobiography in Russian:

Interviews
 
 
  
 

1931 births
2023 deaths
Writers from Kharkiv
Soviet Jews
Ukrainian Jews
Saint Petersburg State University alumni
Soviet philologists
20th-century philologists
Soviet dissidents
Soviet human rights activists
Soviet psychiatric abuse whistleblowers
Psychiatric survivor activists
Campaign Against Psychiatric Abuse
Soviet emigrants to Israel
Soviet emigrants to France